Eucosmocara is a monotypic moth genus of the family Erebidae. Its only species, Eucosmocara plumifera, is known from Borneo. Both the genus and the species were first described by Charles Swinhoe in 1901.

References

Hypeninae
Monotypic moth genera